Tischerioidea is the superfamily of "trumpet" leaf miner moths. The superfamily contains just one family, Tischeriidae, and traditionally one genus, Tischeria, but currently three genera are recognised, widespread around the world including South America (Davis, 1986), except for Australasia (Puplesis and Diskus, 2003). This is one candidate as the sister group (see also Palaephatoidea) of the bulk of Lepidoptera, the Ditrysia (Davis, 1999; Wiegmann et al., 2002), and they have a monotrysian type of female reproductive system. These small moths are leaf-miners in the caterpillar stage, feeding mainly on Fagaceae (Tischeria and Coptotriche), Asteraceae, and Malvaceae (Astrotischeria), and some also on Rhamnaceae, Tiliaceae, and Rosaceae.

References

Davis D.R. (1986). A new family of monotrysian moth from austral South America (Lepidoptera: Palaephatidae), with a phylogenetic review of the Monotrysia. Smithsonian Contributions to Zoology, 434: 1-202.
Davis, D.R. (1999). The Monotrysian Heteroneura. Ch. 6, pp. 65–90 in Kristensen, N.P. (Ed.). Lepidoptera, Moths and Butterflies. Volume 1: Evolution, Systematics, and Biogeography. Handbuch der Zoologie. Eine Naturgeschichte der Stämme des Tierreiches / Handbook of Zoology. A Natural History of the phyla of the Animal Kingdom. Band / Volume IV Arthropoda: Insecta Teilband / Part 35: 491 pp. Walter de Gruyter, Berlin, New York.
Puplesis, R. & Diskus,A. (2003). The Nepticuloidea and Tischerioidea (Lepidoptera) - a Global Review with Strategic Regional Revisions. 512 pp. Apollo books. .
Wiegmann, B.M., Regier, J.C. and Mitter, C. (2002). Combined molecular and morphological evidence on the phylogeny of the earliest lepidopteran lineages. Zoologica Scripta, 31(1): 67-81.

Sources
Firefly Encyclopedia of Insects and Spiders, edited by Christopher O'Toole, 2002

External links
Watson, L., and Dallwitz, M.J. 2003 onwards. British insects: the families of Lepidoptera. Version: 29 December 2011 Detailed description and figures including wing venation.
Family description
UK Moths
UK leaf mines
UK species
World overview
Natural History Museum Hosts database
Microleps U.S.A. (Nearctic)

 
Lepidoptera superfamilies
Leaf miners